Sapphire Tower is the 17th tallest building in San Diego, California and is a prominent fixture in San Diego's skyline. It has a height of 380 ft (116 m) and contains 97 units. Located at the southwest corner of Kettner Boulevard and A Street in the Core district of Downtown San Diego, Sapphire Tower is a 32-story building that utilizes the late-modernist architectural style and was designed by the architect firm Austin Veum Robbins Parshalle.

See also
List of tallest buildings in San Diego

External links 
Official site

Residential buildings completed in 2008
Residential skyscrapers in San Diego